Vladimir Genrikhovich Dolgov (11 May 1960 – 10 January 2022) was a backstroke swimmer from the Soviet Union. He won the bronze medal in the men's 100m backstroke event at the 1980 Summer Olympics in Moscow, USSR. He later emigrated to the United States, working as a swimming coach for Sailfish Aquatics at Huntersville Family Fitness & Aquatics in North Carolina. 

Dolgov died from stomach cancer on 10 January 2022, at the age of 61.

References

External links
 

1960 births
2022 deaths
Russian male swimmers
Soviet male swimmers
Male backstroke swimmers
Swimmers at the 1980 Summer Olympics
Olympic swimmers of the Soviet Union
Olympic bronze medalists for the Soviet Union
Place of birth missing
Olympic bronze medalists in swimming
Medalists at the 1980 Summer Olympics
Universiade medalists in swimming
Universiade silver medalists for the Soviet Union
Medalists at the 1981 Summer Universiade
Sportspeople from Kharkiv
Deaths from cancer in North Carolina
Deaths from stomach cancer